The 1922 Dissolution Honours List was issued on 19 October 1922 at the advice of the outgoing Prime Minister, David Lloyd George.

Earldoms
 The Rt Hon. Frederick Edwin Smith, 1st Viscount Birkenhead
 The Rt Hon. Horace Brand, 1st Viscount Farquhar, for political services.

Viscountcies
 The Rt Hon. Arthur Hamilton, 1st Baron Lee of Fareham, GBE, KCB
 The Rt Hon. William Hesketh, 1st Baron Leverhulme, for public services.

Baronies
 Sir John Henry Bethell, Bt.
 The Rt Hon. Sir Edward Alfred Goulding, Bt.
 The Rt Hon. Sir Joseph Paton Maclay, Bt., LLD, JP
 Lt-Col The Rt Hon. Francis Bingham Mildmay

Privy Council
 Lt-Col Sir John Gilmour, Bt.
 Sir Samuel Roberts, Bt.
 Sir Arthur Tutton James Salvidge, KBE, for political and municipal services.
 Sir William Sutherland, KCB
 William Dudley Ward
 Lieutenant-Commander Edward Hilton Young, DSO, DSC, RNVR

Baronets
 Major Henry Leonard Campbell Brassey
 The Rt Hon. Sir William Bull
 Sir Ellis William Hume-Williams, KBE, KC.
 Alderman Max Muspratt
 The Rt Hon. Sir Ernest Murray Pollock, KBE, KC

Knighthoods
 Benjamin Leonard (or Lennard) Cherry, Lawyer and Parliamentary draughtsman
 Lieutenant-Commander Harry Warden Stanley Chilcott, JP
 John Cecil Davies, Steel manufacturer
 Walford Davies
 Neville Jodrell, MP
 Miles Walker Mattinson, KC
 John William Pratt
 William Price, JP
 Lieutenant Wilfrid Hart Sugden
 Dr. Richard Runciman Terry, Mus.D, FRCO
 Arthur Underhill, MA, LLD, Barrister
 Alexander Wood, Provost of Partick

Companions of Honour

Member
 Sir Hall Caine, KBE, for services to literature.
 The Rt Hon. Winston Churchill
 Sir Evan Vincent Evans
 The Rev'd John Henry Jowett

Order of St. Michael and St. George

Knight Grand Cross (GCMG)
 Lt-Col Sir John Robert Chancellor, KCMG, DSO

The Most Honourable Order of the Bath

Knight Commander (KCB)
 Alfred William Cope, CB
 John Thomas Davies, CB, CVO

Companion (CB)
 Hon. Albert Edward Alexander Napier

Order of the British Empire

Knight Grand Cross (GBE)
 The Rt Hon. John Herbert Lewis
 Sir Philip Sassoon, Bt., CMG

Commander (CBE)
 Eric Allden
 Dr Harvey Hilliard
 Pembroke Wicks
 John Wilson MBE

References

Dissolution Honours
Dissolution Honours 1922